Church Rock is a pillar in Navajo County, Arizona. It is one of the eroded volcanic plugs, or diatremes, of the Navajo Volcanic Field, which is a volcanic field that includes intrusions and flows of minette and other unusual igneous rocks which formed around 30 million years ago during the Oligocene.

History
Church Rock was originally named Artenesales de Piedra or Sculpted Rock, by the Mexican merchant and explorer Antonio Armijo in 1829–1830, when the area was explored by his expedition to find a trade route between Santa Fe de Nuevo México and Alta California.  This would become the Armijo Route of the Old Spanish Trail.

Gallery

Climate
Spring and fall are the most favorable seasons to visit Church Rock. According to the Köppen climate classification system, it is located in a semi-arid climate zone with cold winters and hot summers. Summers average 54 days above  annually, and highs rarely exceed . Summer nights are comfortably cool, and temperatures drop quickly after sunset. Winters are cold, but daytime highs are usually above freezing. Winter temperatures below  are uncommon, though possible.

References

External links

Geography of Navajo County, Arizona
Rock formations of Arizona
Old Spanish Trail (trade route)
Colorado Plateau
Landforms of Navajo County, Arizona
Geography of the Navajo Nation
Oligocene volcanism
Diatremes of Arizona
Volcanic plugs of Arizona